Sittard is a railway station located in Sittard, Netherlands. The station was opened in 1862 and is located on the Maastricht–Venlo railway and the Sittard–Herzogenrath railway. Train services are operated by Nederlandse Spoorwegen and Arriva. All services from South Limburg to the north pass through Sittard.

Sittard has the longest railway platform in the Netherlands with a length of 700 metres.

Train services
The following train services call at this station:
Express services:
Intercity: (Schagen–)Alkmaar–Amsterdam–Utrecht–Eindhoven–Maastricht
Intercity: Enkhuizen–Amsterdam–Utrecht–Eindhoven–Maastricht
Intercity: Enkhuizen–Amsterdam–Utrecht–Eindhoven–Heerlen
Local services:
Stoptrein: Sittard–Heerlen–Kerkrade
Stoptrein: Roermond–Sittard–Maastricht Randwyck

References

External links
NS website 
Dutch public transport travel planner 

Railway stations in Sittard-Geleen
Railway stations opened in 1862
Railway stations on the Staatslijn E
1862 establishments in the Netherlands
Railway stations in the Netherlands opened in the 19th century